Arenimonas is a genus of Pseudomonadota from the family Xanthomonadaceae.

References

Further reading 
 
 
 
 

Xanthomonadales
Bacteria genera